The 2018 Illinois Attorney General election took place on November 6, 2018, to elect the Attorney General of Illinois. Incumbent Democratic Attorney General Lisa Madigan, who had served since 2003, did not seek re-election to a fifth term. Democrat Kwame Raoul won the election with 55 percent of the vote, while Republican Erika Harold took 43 percent of the vote.

Election information
The primaries and general elections coincided with those for federal congressional races and those for other state offices. The election was part of the 2018 Illinois elections.

Turnout

For the primary elections, turnout was 24.57%, with 1,951,981 votes cast. For the general election, turnout was 56.16%, with 4,548,409 votes cast.

Democratic primary

Candidates

Declared
Scott Drury, state representative
Sharon Fairley, chief administrator of the Chicago Civilian Office of Police Accountability
Aaron Goldstein, Democratic committeeman for Chicago's 33rd ward and former defense attorney for Rod Blagojevich
Renato Mariotti, former federal prosecutor, television legal analyst and commentator
Pat Quinn, former Governor of Illinois (2009–2015) and Lieutenant Governor of Illinois (2003–2009)
Kwame Raoul, state senator
Nancy Rotering, mayor of Highland Park
Jesse Ruiz, Chicago Park District President and former chairman of the Illinois State Board of Education

Declined
 Jennifer Burke, former member of the Illinois Pollution Control Board
 Sarah Burke, director of external affairs at Northwestern Memorial Hospital
 Gery Chico, former chairman of the Illinois State Board of Education
 Tom Dart, Cook County Sheriff and nominee for Illinois State Treasurer in 2002
 Zach Fardon, former United States Attorney for the Northern District of Illinois
 Kim Foxx, Cook County State's Attorney
 Jack D. Franks, chairman of the McHenry County Board
 James Glasgow, Will County State's Attorney
 Mike Hastings, state senator
 David Hoffman, former federal prosecutor, former Chicago Inspector General, and candidate for U.S. Senate in 2010
 Dan Hynes, former Illinois Comptroller (1999–2011), candidate for U.S. Senate in 2004, and candidate for governor in 2010
 Lori Lightfoot, president of the Chicago Police Board
 Mike McRaith, former director of the Federal Insurance Office
 Elaine Nekritz, assistant majority Leader of the Illinois House of Representatives
 Andrew Schapiro, former United States Ambassador to the Czech Republic
 Ira Silverstein, majority caucus chair of the Illinois Senate.
 Mariyana Spyropoulos, president of the Metropolitan Water Reclamation District
 Chris Welch, state representative
 Ann Williams, state representative
 Andrea Zopp, deputy mayor of Chicago and candidate for U.S. Senate in 2016

Endorsements

Polling
{| class="wikitable" style="font-size:90%;text-align:center;"
|- valign=bottom
! Poll source
! Date(s)administered
! Samplesize
! Marginof error
! style="width:45px;"| KwameRaoul
! style="width:45px;"| PatQuinn
! style="width:45px;"| NancyRotering
! style="width:45px;"| JesseRuiz
! style="width:45px;"| RenatoMariotti
! style="width:45px;"| SharonFairley
! style="width:45px;"| AaronGoldstein
! style="width:45px;"| ScottDrury
! Other
! Undecided
|-
|style="text-align:left;"| Victory Research
| align=center| March 13–16, 2018
| align=center| 1,204
| align=center| ± 2.8%
| align=center| 24%
|  align=center| 26%
| align=center| 6%
| align=center| 4%
| align=center| 3%
| align=center| 8%
| align=center| 4%
| align=center| 10%
| align=center| –
| align=center| 16%
|-
|style="text-align:left;"| Capitol Fax/We Ask America
| align=center| March 7–8, 2018
| align=center| 1,029
| align=center| ± 3.06%
| align=center| 15%
|  align=center| 23%
| align=center| 6%
| align=center| 3%
| align=center| 3%
| align=center| 3%
| align=center| 2%
| align=center| 3%
| align=center| –
|  align=center| 43%
|-
|style="text-align:left;"| Southern Illinois University
| align=center| February 19–25, 2018
| align=center| 472
| align=center| ± 4.5%
|  align=center| 22%
| align=center| 18%
| align=center| 5%
| align=center| 4%
| align=center| 3%
| align=center| 3%
| align=center| 3%
| align=center| 2%
| align=center| 1%
|  align=center| 39%

Results

Republican primary

Candidates

Declared
 Gary Grasso, DuPage County Board member and former mayor of Burr Ridge
Erika Harold, former Miss America and candidate for Illinois's 13th congressional district in 2014

Declined
 Jason Barickman, state senator
 Daniel Cronin, chairman of the DuPage County Board
 Tom Cross, former minority leader of the Illinois House of Representatives and nominee for Illinois State Treasurer in 2014
 Kirk Dillard, former state senator and candidate for governor in 2010 and 2014
 Jim Durkin, minority leader of the Illinois House of Representatives
 Joseph McMahon, Kane County State's Attorney

Endorsements

Polling

Results

Third party and independents

Candidates

Declared
Bubba Harsy (Libertarian)

Declined
Tyson Manker, Iraq War veteran and candidate for Morgan County State's Attorney in 2016

General election

Endorsements

Polling

Results

See also
2018 Illinois elections

References

External links
Official campaign websites
Erika Harold (R) for Attorney General
Bubba Harsy (L) for Attorney General
Kwame Raoul (D) for Attorney General

Attorney General
Illinois
Illinois Attorney General elections